The 9th Indian Infantry Division was an infantry division of the Indian Army during World War II. The division formed part of Indian III Corps in the Malaya Command during the Battle of Malaya. It was commanded by Major-General Arthur Edward Barstow.

History
The 9th Indian Infantry Division was formed on 15 September 1940 at Quetta, India before being transferred to Malaya. On 15 September 1940 the three original brigades of the division were the 15th, 20th, and 21st Indian Infantry Brigades. The 3/17th Dogra Regiment from the 9th Division was the first British Commonwealth Army unit to see action against the Japanese at the Battle of Kota Bharu on 8 December 1941. The 9th Indian Division fought a relatively successful defensive retreat down Malaya's east coast until the 22nd Brigade was cut off from the rest of the division at a demolished railway bridge near the village of Layang Layang in the state of Johore. Major-General Barstow was killed crossing the bridge, while attempting to contact the brigade. The 22nd Brigade was destroyed whilst trying to find another way to Singapore.

What was left of the division was amalgamated with the 11th Indian Division.

Component Units 1941 – 1942
8th Indian Infantry Brigade – Brigadier Berthold Wells (Billy) Key
3/17th Dogra Regiment – Lieut.Col George Alan Preston DSO (WIA at Kota Bharu)
2/10th Baluch Regiment – Lieut.Col James Frith
2/12th Frontier Force Regiment (2nd Sikhs) – Lieut.Col Arthur Cumming V.C.
1st Mysore Infantry (Indian States Forces) – Lieut.Col K.H.Preston
1st Hyderabad Infantry (Indian States Forces) – Lt.Col Charles Albert "Clive" Hendrick (KIA at Kota Bharu)

22nd Indian Infantry Brigade – Brigadier George Painter
Brigadier Painter
2/18th Royal Garhwal Rifles – Lt.Col L.H.Cockram/ Lt.Col G.E.R.S.Hartigan
5/11th Sikh Regiment – Lieut.Col John Parkin/ MacAdam
1/13th Frontier Force Rifles – Lieut.Col Clarence Gilbert

Support Units 
CRA – Brigadier E.W. Goodman 
5th Field Regt. – Lieut.Col E.W.F.Jephson Royal Artillery (16x4.5-inch Howitzers)
88th Field Regt. – Lieut.Col Sylvain Claude D'Aubuz Royal Artillery (24x25pdrs)
80th Anti-Tank Regt. – Lieut.Col W.Napier Royal Artillery (48x2pdrs/47mm Bredas)
21st Mountain Battery, IA – Major J.B.Soper IA (4xQF 3.7-inch mountain howitzers)

Footnotes

Books

External links
Malaya Conflict Site
 9 Indian Infantry Division (1941–42)

Indian World War II divisions
British Indian Army divisions
Military units and formations of the British Empire in World War II
D
Military units and formations established in 1940